Liam Bond (born 29 July 1970) is a Welsh professional golfer.

Professional career
Despite turning professional in 1986 while still in his mid-teens, Bond spent many years working as an assistant club professional, and didn't attempt to qualify for the European Tour until 1995. He won his own national championship in 1998, and finished 11th on the recently formed PGA EuroPro Tour in 2003, but didn't qualify for the second-tier Challenge Tour until 2007, when he was 36. His debut season at this level was successful, recording a runner-up finish in his second tournament and ending the year ranked 31st. He never bettered either achievement in the three subsequent years, but enjoyed steady seasons. At the end of 2010, Bond finally qualified for the European Tour for the first time at the age of 40, on his 15th visit to the qualifying school.

Professional wins (4)

EuroPro Tour wins (2)
1999 MasterCard Tour Championship
2000 PGA Europro Tour Championship

Other wins (2)
1998 Welsh PGA Championship
2006 Beko Classic (Turkey)

Playoff record
Challenge Tour playoff record (0–1)

See also
2010 European Tour Qualifying School graduates

References

External links

Welsh male golfers
European Tour golfers
Sportspeople from Southport
Sportspeople from Newport, Wales
1970 births
Living people